The Dawson County Jail in Dawsonville, Georgia, also known as Old Dawson County Jail, is listed on the National Register of Historic Places.  It was built in 1881 and modified in 1931, 1974, and 1979.  It was built by M.B. McGinty, a builder from Athens, Georgia.

The jail is a two-story  by  red brick, Italianate-style building with a hipped roof that used to be covered by "good heart-pine shingles laid 5 inches to the weather".

It is the third building to be Dawson County's jail;  the first, built in 1858, was destroyed by fire set by a prisoner in 1865 or 1866.  The second jail, with wooden walls and floors, had a "criminal floor" which was noted in 1873 to be "fine", but the "debtor's floor" was "not secure".

References

Jails on the National Register of Historic Places in Georgia (U.S. state)
Italianate architecture in Georgia (U.S. state)
Government buildings completed in 1881
National Register of Historic Places in Dawson County, Georgia